Algonquin (also spelled Algonkin; in Algonquin:  or ) is either a distinct Algonquian language closely related to the Ojibwe language or a particularly divergent Ojibwe dialect. It is spoken, alongside French and to some extent English, by the Algonquin First Nations of Quebec and Ontario.  As of 2006, there were 2,680 Algonquin speakers, less than 10% of whom were monolingual. Algonquin is the language for which the entire Algonquian language subgroup is named; the similarity among the names often causes considerable confusion.  Like many Native American languages, it is strongly verb-based, with most meaning being incorporated into verbs instead of using separate words for prepositions, tense, etc.

Classification

 (Algonquin) is an Algonquian language, of the Algic family of languages, and is descended from Proto-Algonquian. It is considered a particularly divergent dialect of Ojibwe by many. The rest of the Omàmìwininìmowin (Algonquin) communities call themselves  ('down-stream men'), and the language  ('speech of the down-stream men').

The Potawatomi language was considered a divergent dialect of Anishinaabemowin (the Anishinaabe language) but now is considered a separate language. Culturally,  (Algonquin) and the Michi Saagiig (Mississaugas) were not part of the Ojibwe–Odawa–Potawatomi alliance known as the Council of Three Fires. The  (Algonquins) maintained stronger cultural ties with the Abenaki, Atikamekw and Cree.

Among sister Algonquian languages are Blackfoot, Cheyenne, Cree, Fox, Menominee, Potawatomi, and Shawnee. The Algic family contains the Algonquian languages and the so-called "Ritwan" languages, Wiyot and Yurok. Ojibwe and its similar languages are frequently referred to as a "Central Algonquian" language; however, Central Algonquian is an areal grouping rather than a genetic one. Among Algonquian languages, only the Eastern Algonquian languages constitute a true genetic subgroup.

Dialects
Speakers at Kitigan Zibi consider their language to be Southern Algonquin, though linguistically it is a dialect of Nipissing Ojibwa which, together with Mississauga Ojibwa and Odawa, form the Nishnaabemwin (Eastern Ojibwa) group of the Ojibwa dialect continuum.

Phonology

Consonants
The consonant phonemes and major allophones of Algonquin in Cuoq spelling, one of several common orthographies, and its common variants are listed below (with IPA notation in brackets):

In an older orthography still popular in some of the Algonquin communities, known as the Malhiot spelling, which the above Cuoq spelling was based upon, are listed below (with IPA notation in brackets):

Aspiration and allophony
The Algonquin consonants p, t and k are unaspirated when they are pronounced between two vowels or after an m or n; plain voiceless and voiceless aspirated stops in Algonquin are thus allophones. So  ('day') is pronounced , but  ('working day') is pronounced .

Vowels

Diphthongs

Nasal vowels
Algonquin does have nasal vowels, but they are allophonic variants (similar to how in English vowels are sometimes nasalized before m and n). In Algonquin, vowels automatically become nasal before nd, ndj, ng, nh, nhi, nj or nz.  For example,  ('fish') is pronounced , not .

Stress
Word stress in Algonquin is complex but regular. Words are divided into iambic feet (an iambic foot being a sequence of one "weak" syllable plus one "strong" syllable), counting long vowels (à, è, ì, ò) as a full foot (a foot consisting of a single "strong" syllable). The primary stress is then normally on the strong syllable of the third foot from the end of the word—which, in words that are five syllables long or less, usually translates in practical terms to the first syllable (if it has a long vowel) or the second syllable (if not). The strong syllables of the remaining iambic feet each carry secondary stress, as do any final weak syllables.

See also 
 Ojibwe dialects
 Algonquian Bible
 List of First Nations place names in Canada
 Algonquian–Basque pidgin

References

Further reading

 Artuso, Christian. 1998.  noogom gaa-izhi-anishinaabemonaaniwag: Generational Difference in Algonquin.  Winnipeg: The University of Manitoba Press. 

 Cuoq, Jean André. 1866. Études philologiques sur quelques langues sauvages de l'Amérique.  Montréal: Dawson.
 Cuoq, Jean André. 1886. Lexique de la Langue Algonquine.  Montréal: J. Chapleau & Fils.
 Cuoq, Jean André. 1891? Grammaire de la Langue Algonquine.  [S.l.: s.n.]

 Mcgregor, Ernest. 1994. Algonquin Lexicon. Maniwaki, QC: Kitigan Zibi Education Council.
 Mithun, Marianne.  1999.  The Languages of Native North America.  Cambridge Language Surveys.  Cambridge:  Cambridge University Press.

External links

French - Algonquin dictionary from the Algonquin Nation Tribal Council
Algonquins of Golden Lake word-list recordings
Eagle Village First Nation Algonquin Language page
Hail Mary in Algonquin
Children Singing Peace Around the World in Algonquin
Native Languages page for Algonquin
Algonquin orthography and phonology
OLAC resources in and about the Algonquin language

Central Algonquian languages
Anishinaabe languages
Indigenous languages of the North American eastern woodlands
First Nations languages in Canada
Languages of the United States